The House of Sforza was a ruling family of Renaissance Italy, based in Milan. They acquired the Duchy of Milan following the extinction of the Visconti family in the mid-15th century, Sforza rule ending in Milan with the death of the last member of the family's main branch in 1535.

History

The first son of Muzio Attendolo Sforza, Francesco I Sforza, married Bianca Maria (1425–1468) in 1441. She was the daughter and only heir of the last Duke of Milan, (Filippo Maria Visconti). He thus acquired the title of Duke of Milan (1450–1466), ruled Milan for 16 years, and made the Sforzas the heirs of the house of Visconti.

The family also held the seigniory of Pesaro, starting with Muzio Attendolo's second son, Alessandro (1409–1473). The Sforza held Pesaro until 1512, after the death of Costanzo II Sforza.

Muzio's third son, Bosio (1411–1476), founded the branch of Santa Fiora, who held the title of count of Cotignola; the Sforza ruled the small county of Santa Fiora in southern Tuscany until 1624. Members of this family also held important ecclesiastical and political positions in the Papal States, and moved to Rome in 1674, taking the name of Sforza Cesarini.

The Sforza became allied with the Borgia family through the arranged marriage (1493–1497) between Lucrezia Borgia and Giovanni (the illegitimate son of Costanzo I of Pesaro). This alliance failed, as the Borgia family annulled the marriage once the Sforza family were no longer needed.

In 1499, in the course of the Italian Wars, the army of Louis XII of France took Milan from Ludovico Sforza (known as Ludovico il Moro, famous for taking Leonardo da Vinci into his service).

After Imperial German troops drove out the French, Maximilian Sforza, son of Ludovico, became Duke of Milan (1512–1515) until the French returned under Francis I of France and imprisoned him.

In 1521 Charles V drove out the French and restored the younger son of Ludovico, Francesco II Sforza to the duchy. Francesco remained the ruler of Milan until his death in 1535 and as he was childless the Duchy reverted to the Emperor, who passed it to his son Philip II in 1540, thus beginning the period of Spanish rule in Milan.

Sforza rulers of the Duchy of Milan

 Francesco I, 1450–1466
 Galeazzo Maria, 1466–1476
 Gian Galeazzo, 1476–1494
 Ludovico, 1494–1499
 Massimiliano, 1513–1515
 Francesco II, 1521–1535

Sforza rulers of Pesaro and Gradara
 Alessandro, 1445–1473
 Costanzo I, 1473–1483
 Giovanni, 1483–1500 and 1503–1510
 Costanzo II, 1510–1512
 , 1512

Sforza family tree

 Muzio Sforza with mistress Lucia da Torsano had 7 illegitimate sons
 son Gabriele Sforza archbishop of Milan
 son Francesco I Sforza married Bianca Maria Visconti
 son Galeazzo Maria Sforza married Bona of Savoy, mistress Lucrezia Landriani
 daughter Bianca Maria (1472–1510), second wife of Holy Roman Emperor Maximilian I
 son Gian Galeazzo (1469–1494), married his cousin Isabella of Naples
 son Francesco (II), nominally duke under the regency of Ludovico Maria
 daughter Bona (1494–1557), second wife of King Sigismund I of Poland
 daughter Ippolita Maria Sforza (1493–1501)
 illegitimate daughter Caterina Sforza married Giovanni de' Medici il Popolano
 illegitimate son Ottaviano Maria Sforza bishop of Lodi
 son Ludovico il Moro (the Moor) (1451–1508)
 son Ercole Massimiliano
 son Francesco II (III) Maria
 illegitimate daughter Bianca Sforza (1483–1496) married to Galeazzo Sanseverino
 illegitimate son Giovanni Paolo I (1497–1535), marquess of Caravaggio
 son Ascanio (1444–1505), Cardinal
 daughter Ippolita Maria (1446–1484), married king of Alfonso II d'Aragon of Naples
 illegitimate daughter Polissena (1428-1449), married Sigismondo Pandolfo Malatesta
 son Alessandro, first lord of Pesaro
 son Costanzo I
 son Giovanni (1466–1510), first husband of Lucrezia Borgia
 son Costanzo II (Giovanni Maria) last ruler of Pesaro
 Bosio (count of Cotignola, lord of Castell'Arquato)

Notable members

Castellini Baldissera 
While the House of Sforza has died out over the last century, it is closely related to the Castellini Baldissera family, who inherited a number of their palazzos and estates.

In popular culture
 One of the cursed artefacts from Friday the 13th: The Series was the "Sforza Glove", attributed to the original family's possession.
 Thomas Harris's character Hannibal Lecter is a descendant of the House of Sforza.
 In the book, anime, and manga series Trinity Blood, the Duchess of Milan, who is also one of the Cardinals, is named Caterina Sforza.
 Caterina Sforza appears as a non-playable character in the video game Assassin's Creed 2 and its sequel, Assassin's Creed: Brotherhood.
 The Sforza figure prominently in the Showtime series The Borgias.
 The house is mentioned in a song about the Borgia family in the British edutainment TV show Horrible Histories.
 There are notable members from the family in the television series Medici.

See also
 Gradara
 Italian Wars
 List of rulers of Milan

References

External links 
 

 
Dukes of Milan
Italian noble families
Roman Catholic families